The Bolder Boulder (styled as BOLDERBoulder and previously BolderBOULDER) is an annual 10-kilometer run in Boulder, Colorado. The most recent race featured over 54,000 runners, walkers, and wheelchair racers, making it the second largest 10k race in the US and the fifth largest road race in the world. It has one of the largest non-marathon prize purses in road racing. 

The race culminates at the University of Colorado's Folsom Field with a Memorial Day Tribute with one of the largest Memorial Day gatherings in the United States. Organizers have dedicated three starting waves to current and former members of the U.S. armed forces.

On March 16, 2020, organizers of the Bolder Boulder race initially decided to postpone the race, usually held on Memorial Day, until Labor Day due to COVID-19.  On June 1, organizers then decided to cancel the 2020 race entirely.

From 2002-2005, the presenting sponsor of the race was Celestial Seasonings. From 2008-2012, the named sponsor was Dick's Sporting Goods.

Past winners

Key:

References

List of winners
Rich Castro & Marty Post (2010-06-03). Bolder Boulder 10 km. Association of Road Racing Statisticians. Retrieved on 2010-10-28.

External links
Official site
DailyCamera.com - Boulder news, results, view photos, read commentary and watch an audio slideshow

Foot races in Colorado
Culture of Boulder, Colorado
10K runs in the United States
Sports in Boulder, Colorado
Tourist attractions in Boulder, Colorado
Annual sporting events in the United States
1979 establishments in Colorado
Recurring sporting events established in 1979